Baltoubaye is a sub-prefecture of Moyen-Chari Region in Chad.

References 

Populated places in Chad